SuperATV is a United States based privately owned company founded in 2003. The company sells aftermarket products for Utility task vehicles (UTVs) and all-terrain vehicles (ATVs). SuperATV is a family-run business located in a small Indiana town. The business has grown substantially from its founding to the current day.

Founding 
Harold Hunt, an entrepreneur, created the first product, the 2" Polaris Sportsman EZ Install Lift Kit, after seeing the need for aftermarket products for the ATV industry. The EZ Install Lift Kit was first designed, manufactured, and shipped out of Hunt's garage until he had a need to start expanding to meet the products demand. As the popularity of side by sides (UTVs) grew with the release of the Yamaha Rhino in 2004 and the 2008 Polaris Ranger RZR, so did the demand for aftermarket UTV parts. SuperATV sells products for both all-terrain vehicles and utility task vehicles.

Hunt, the president of the business, registered his LLC in 2003 and later trademarked the logo in 2013. His love for the outdoors and creek riding led to the birth of a major company, while his business and manufacturing knowledge helped it continue to grow. Hunt gained extensive knowledge in many areas of business while Vice President of Global Operations at Rotary Lift. He worked at Rotary lift for a total of 27 years before leaving to focus on his own business.

Since the move from Hunt's garage, SuperATV has been headquartered in four locations, each move getting bigger than the last. As of December 2018, the company had grown into a two hundred thousand square foot building with two hundred and eight full-time employees. The company's headquarters is in Madison, a small Indiana town. SuperATV received accolades from former Indiana Governor and current United States Vice President Mike Pence for being a homegrown small business that is creating jobs in the rural town. Fifteen years after its humble beginnings the business is still owned by Harold Hunt, is still family-run, and has grown to be one of the largest suppliers of aftermarket ATV and UTV accessories in North America.

Hunt is also the owner of Clifty Warehouse & Storage, LLC, which provides storage for both commercial and industrial items. The Warehouse and SuperATV were once operating out of the same building until they both outgrew the shared space. Clifty Warehouse also has full-time employees and is a small business located in the same area.

Location 
Headquarters for SuperATV are in Madison, Indiana. Madison borders the Ohio River and recorded approximately twelve thousand residents in the 2010 census. Madison is a 209-year-old town that has a historic main street downtown but is also home to many manufacturing industries.  Madison is located within two hours of Cincinnati, Louisville, and Indianapolis, its central location makes it ideal for small businesses to thrive.

New facilities and expansion 
In 2016 SuperATV moved from its building on Clifty Drive to their new 232,000 square foot facility. This 4.95-million-dollar investment allowed the business to continue to expand and grow. The building was first built in 1958 and was used by several different manufacturing companies before US Filter vacated the building. SuperATV then bought, gutted, and renovated the building. Renovations for the building began in late 2015 and the company officially moved in 2016.  In 2015, when the expansion was still in the works SuperATV projected that by the year 2018, they would be able to add at least one-hundred full-time jobs because of the expansion. The new building has a product testing lab, stocked product, in-house assembly, and a test track. Engineers create, build, and test prototypes all in the same facility. On-site product design and testing has allowed SuperATV to control quality. 
 
 
The new building also provided more room and resources to hire part-time interns and students from the community. In 2016, they partnered with the Conexus Indiana program that gives select high school students six-week paid internships in manufacturing. This is one way the business has attempted to reach out and support Madison's residents by providing opportunities to high school students.

Products 

SuperATV is web based company predominantly serving its customers online and over the phone. They sell products for UTV's and ATV's in the side-by-side industry including brands such as Polaris, Can-Am, Yamaha, Honda, Kawasaki, Arctic Cat, Suzuki The first product sold was the 2” Polaris Sportsman EZ Install Lift Kit, there have been major product advancements since then. The first lift kit was a bolt on kit that added about 2 inches of clearance when added with stock tires, now Super ATV sells lift kits that add up to ten inches of clearance. The Polaris Sportsman lift kit was originally designed because Hunt wanted a quality lift kit for his own ride. After the first kits saw some success with friends, he began selling them on eBay. Hunt quickly realized the demand for products was growing and the company's product line expanded. Currently, their product line includes windshields, tires, portal gear lift kits, clutch kits, axles, and more.

All of the products sold on their own website are their own with the one exception of MTX speakers. For the majority of SuperATV's history, sales were based on consumer direct purchases. Now their products are not only sold on the SuperATV website, but also through dealers. Everything on their website is kept in-stock at their facility in Madison, Indiana. This reduces shipping time, so products arrive quickly after order. These products are often branded and trademarked by SuperATV. Some sub-brands include Rhino Axles, GDP Portals, Intimidator Tires, Rack Boss, and more.

Team SuperATV 
SuperATV has gained popularity in the racing community, too. In 2015 they sponsored professional drivers Mitch Guthrie Jr., Mitch Guthrie Sr,. Sara Price, and Katie Vernola. Guthrie Jr. won the off-road challenge at King of the Hammers in 2018. He used SuperATV's Rhino Axles on his vehicle. This course was particularly rough in comparison to years past, as only ten percent of the riders made it to the finish. Guthrie Sr. had won the race six times in his career.

In 2016, a team of employee drivers led by Tyler Greves, an employee at SuperATV and professional driver, competed in the World Championships at King of the Hammers. SuperATV also holds their own events and sponsors races.

References 

American companies established in 2003